Joseph Stoppenbach (March 19, 1862 – August 7, 1944) was an American businessman and politician.

Born in Jefferson, Wisconsin, Stoppenbach was in the malt and meat packing business. Stoppenbach served on the school board and was a Democrat. In 1891, Stoppenbach served in the Wisconsin State Assembly. He died at his daughter's home in Jefferson, Wisconsin.

Notes

1862 births
1944 deaths
People from Jefferson, Wisconsin
Businesspeople from Wisconsin
School board members in Wisconsin
Democratic Party members of the Wisconsin State Assembly